The Xianfeng Emperor had eighteen consorts, including three empresses, two imperial noble consorts, two noble consorts, four consorts, four concubines and three first attendants. The consorts are classified according to their posthumous titles.

Empresses 

 Empress Xiaodexian (1831-1850), of the Sakda clan. During her lifetime, she was the imperial primary princess consort, but died before Yizhu's coronation.
 Empress Dowager Ci'an (1837-1881), of the Niohuru clan, reigned as empress from 1852 to 1861. After 1861, she held the title of Mother Empress, Empress Dowager Ci'an. Her posthumous title was Empress Xiaozhenxian.
 Empress Dowager Cixi (1835-1908), Yehe-Nara Xingzhen (杏贞). The highest title she held during the Xianfeng era was Noble Consort Yi (懿贵妃). From 1861 to 1908, she held the title of Holy Mother, Empress Dowager Cixi. At that time she was acting as a regent on behalf of the Tongzhi and Guangxu Emperors.

Imperial Noble Consorts 

 Imperial Noble Consort Zhuangjing (2 April 1837 – 26 December 1890), of the Tatara clan, was promoted to Imperial Noble Consort in 1861.
 Imperial Noble Consort Duanke (3 December 1844 – 7 May 1910), of the Tunggiya clan, was promoted to Imperial Noble Consort in 1908.

Noble Consorts 

 Noble Consort Mei ( 1835 – 20 December 1890), of the Xu clan, was promoted to Noble Consort in 1875.
 Noble Consort Wan (17 November 1835 – 20 June 1894), of the Socoro clan, was promoted to Noble Consort in 1875., personal name Zhaoge (招格)

Consorts 
All consorts were palace maids known as Four Spring Ladies. The name of the clique was derived from their personal names and a poem line "When four springs follow upwards the wind, the copper fish swims in the water every five nights".

《袅袅四春随风撵，沈沈五夜递铜鱼》

The consorts were promoted together within one year. The highest title they held during the Xianfeng era was noble lady.

 Consort Lu (2 March 1841 – 15 May 1895), personal name Yehenara Mudanchun (牡丹春)
 Consort Ji of the Wang clan (吉妃, 王氏; 1846 – 12 November 1905), personal name Xinghuachun (杏花春)
 Consort Xi, of the Cahala clan (禧妃, 察哈喇氏; 4 October 1842 – 26 June 1877), personal name  Haitangchun (海棠春)
 Consort Qing, of the Zhang clan (慶妃, 張氏; 25 October 1840 – 15 June 1885), personal name Wulingchun (武陵春)

Concubines 

 Concubine Yun (雲嬪, 武佳氏; d. 11 January 1856), personal name Ugiya Qiyun (綺雲)

Concubine Rong, of the Irgen Gioro clan (容嬪, 伊爾根覺羅氏; 6 July 1837 – 21 June 1869) 
Concubine Rong, of the Irgen Gioro clan (容嬪 / 容嫔, 伊爾根覺羅氏 / 伊尔根觉罗氏; 6 July 1837 – 21 June 1869) was a consort of the Xianfeng Emperor.

Family background 
Concubine Rong was a booi hehe of Bordered Yellow Banner.

 Father: Sarhangga (薩爾杭阿/萨尔杭阿; 1796- June 1838), served as a teacher in Xian'an Palace (咸安宮) since 1826, was granted 7th civil rank in 1831, became promoted to 6th civil rank in 1836. 
 Paternal grandfather: Tuan'erho (慱爾豁 / 慱尔豁), served as 6th rank tutor (教習) of Ministry of Personnel
 Mother: Lady Luo (駱氏)

Daoguang era 
Lady Irgen Gioro was born on 6 July 1837. When her father died in June 1838, Lady Irgen Gioro and her mother, lady Luo, lived in poverty, enjoying an income of 1 tael monthly. Since 1839, Lady Irgen Gioro with her mother have been receiving a social rent consisting of money and crops.

Xianfeng Era 
Lady Irgen Gioro entered the imperial harem in September 1853 and was bestowed a title of First Class Female Attendant Rong (容常在; tolerant, pretty). Her half-length portrait was hung in the Ruyi pavillion (如意舘) shortly after the entry. In November 1855, First Attendant Rong was promoted to Noble Lady Rong (容貴人) together with majority of Xianfeng Emperor's concubines. She remained childless during the Xianfeng era.

Tongzhi era 
Noble Lady Rong was promoted to Dowager Concubine Rong (皇考容嬪) in 1861. Although Noble Lady Rong was conferred a title of Concubine, Ministry of Internal  Affairs delayed production of sedan chair and gilded promotional document, which was investigated by Ministry of Rites in 1868.

Concubine Rong died on 21 June 1869. Her coffin was transferred to Ji'an study for lying in state. Consort Xi and Consort Qing left the Imperial Palace so as to guard Concubine Rong's coffin. The coffin was temporarily placed in the Tiancun village and thereafter interred in Ding Mausoleum of Eastern Qing tombs. Concubine Rong's personal maids were married off.

Titles

During Daoguang era 

 Lady Irgen Gioro (伊尔根觉罗氏) - from 1837

During Xianfeng era 

 First Class Female Attendant Rong (容常在) - from 1853
 Noble Lady Rong (容贵人) - from 1855

During Tongzhi era 

 Concubine Rong (容嫔) - from 1861

Concubine Shu, of the Yehe Nara clan (璹嬪, 葉赫那拉氏; 27 March 1840 – 9 May 1874)

Concubine Yu, of the Yehe Nara clan (玉嬪, 葉赫那拉氏; 14 August 1843 – 26 December 1863),

First Attendants

First Class Female Attendant Chun 
First Class Female Attendant Chun (瑃常在,暝谙氏; 1835 -1859) was a member of the Ming'an clan.

Daoguang era 
First Class Female Attendant Chun was born in 1835, which translates to 15th year of the Daoguang era. Her family background is not mentioned.

Xianfeng era 
Lady Ming'an entered the palace at the same time as most of the Xianfeng Emperor's consorts, including Empress Dowager Cixi, Imperial Noble Consort Zhuangjing, Noble Consort Mei, Noble Consort Wan. She was granted a title of Noble Lady Chun (春贵人, meaning "spring") upon the entry in 1852. In 1853, she was demoted to First Class Female Attendant Chun (春常在). In 1855, the Head of Palace Administration Zhang Xin proclaimed a decree demoting her further to Second Class Female Attendant without the right to convey a honorifical name. As a substitution for honorifical name, the two characters of her clansname were used. At that time, she had one personal maid and her allowance was 50 taels. In 1856, Lady Ming'an was restored as First Attendant Chun (瑃常在). First Attendant Chun died in 1859. She was interred in the Ding Mausoleum of the Eastern Qing tombs in 1865.春贵人→春常在→答应→瑃常在

First Class Female Attendant Xin 
First Class Female Attendant Xin (鑫常在, 戴佳氏; d.27 May 1859) was a member of Sinjeku caste of the Daigiya clan of Plain White Banner

Family background 

 Father: Jilu (吉禄), served as a slave of Plain White Banner (披甲人)
 Two brothers

Xianfeng era 
Lady Daigiya entered the palace in 1852 and was bestowed a title of First Class Attendant Xin (鑫常在). As the first entered first class attendant, Lady Daigiya was made an informal leader of first attendants.

On 25 June 1857, her personal maid, Daniu, was expelled from palace because of leg ailment. However, it was suspected that actual reason behind Daniu's removal from service differed from declared recuperation.

Lady Daigiya died on 27 May 1859 and her coffin was interred at Ding Mausoleum of Eastern Qing tombs.

First Class Female Attendant Ping 
First Class Female Attendant Ping (玶常在, 伊尔根觉罗氏; d.1856) was a member of the Irgen Gioro clan.

Family background 

 Father: Yanchang (彥昌, b. 1816), served as banquet manager in Guozijian and received a jinshi degree in 1847
 Paternal grandfather: Yingchun (英淳), served as 7th rank civil official (筆貼士)
 Paternal grandmother: Lady Ujaku (烏扎庫氏)
 Mother: Lady Donggo

Xianfeng era 
Lady Irgen Gioro entered the palace in 1852 and was given a title of Noble Lady Ying (英貴人). In March 1852, Noble Lady Ying received one black lacquered copper clock. In October 1852, Lady Irgen Gioro was promoted to Concubine Ying (英嬪) In October 1853, she was demoted to Noble Lady Yi (伊貴人) so as to fullfill the limit of 6 concubines.  On 11 January 1855，during the burial of Concubine Yun all imperial concubines stayed in the Tiancun village. Noble Lady Yi, who arrived from Ji'an studio, departed to the Forbidden city earlier than other concubines. In March 1855, she was demoted to First Class Female Attendant Yi because of her behavior during the funeral. In January 1857, Lady Irgen Gioro was demoted to Second Class Female Attendant. Second Attendant Yi fell ill in May 1856 and was suddenly restored as First Class Female Attendant Ping (玶常在; "ping" as a kind of fine jade). First Class Female Attendant Ping died on 15 August 1856 and was buried in Xihua garden in Tiancun on 27 August 1856. Her coffin was interred in Ding Mausoleum in 1864.

Gallery

Occupation of the palaces in the Forbidden City

References 

Consorts of the Xianfeng Emperor